Trio for horn, violin, and piano may refer to:

 Trio for horn, violin, and piano (Banks)
 Trio for horn, violin, and piano (Berkeley)